Minister of Economy and Planning of Angola is a cabinet level position in the national government. The position was established in 1975 with Henrique Teles Carreira.

Name changes
 1975–1978: Minister of Economy
 1978–1995: Minister of Economy and Finance
 2009–2016: Minister of Economy
 1975–1992: Minister of Planning (Ministro do Plano)
 1994–1997: Minister of Planning (Ministro do Planeamento)
 2012–2013: Minister of Planning and Territory Development
 2017–present: Minister of Economy and Planning

Ministers of Economy and Finance
 1995–1996: Augusto da Silva Tomás
 1996–1999: Mário de Alcântara Monteiro

Ministers of Economy
 2004–2010: Manuel Nunes Júnior
 2010–2017: Abraão Gourgel

Ministers of Planning (Ministros do Plano)
 1975–1978: Carlos Alberto Rocha Oliveira Dilolwa
 1978–1979: José Eduardo dos Santos
 1979–1981: Roberto António Victor Francisco de Almeida
 1981–1986: Lopo Fortunato Ferreira do Nascimento
 1986–1990: António Henriques da Silva
 1990–1991: Fernando José de França Dias Van-Dúnem
 1991–1992: Emanuel Moreira Carneiro

Ministers of Planning (Ministros do Planeamento)
 1994–1996: José Pedro de Morais
 1996–1997: Emanuel Moreira Carneiro
 1999–2012: Ana Afonso Dias Lourenço

Minister of Planning and Territory Development
 2012–2013: Job Graça

Minister of Economy and Planning
 2017–present: Pedro Luís da Fonseca

References

External links
http://www.mep.gov.ao/

Economy and Planning
Economy and Planning Ministers
Politics of Angola